Christian William Feigenspan (December 7, 1876 – February 7, 1939) was president of Feigenspan Brewing Company, president of Federal Trust Company, and president of the United States Brewers' Association.

Birth
He was born in 1876 to Rachel Caroline Laible (1852–1882) and Christian Benjamin Feigenspan (1844–1899) of Thuringia. He had three siblings: Edwin Christian Feigenspan (1886–1953); Eleanor Feigenspan (1892-1986) who married Lewis Bacon Ballantyne; and Johanna Caroline, who married Rudolph Victor Kuser. He graduated from Cornell University in 1898, and his father died in 1899. He married Alis Rule Thoms in 1909, and they had no children from their marriage.

Feigenspan Brewing Company
The brewery started at 49 Charlton Street in Newark, New Jersey, in 1875. In 1878 he moved the brewery to 47 Belmont Avenue in Newark, New Jersey. Around 1890 the brewery was moved to the corner of Freeman and Christie Streets.  The brewer's logo was "P.O.N." (Pride Of Newark). In 1944 the brewery was bought by P. Ballantine and Sons.

Death
He died on February 7, 1939, in Rumson, New Jersey.

Awards
Silver Medal at the Paris Exposition (1878)

References

External links

American people of German descent
American drink industry businesspeople
1876 births
1939 deaths
Cornell University alumni
Businesspeople from Newark, New Jersey
People from Rumson, New Jersey
American brewers
Beer in New Jersey
Place of birth missing